Katajisto is a Finnish surname, which may refer to:

 Janne Katajisto (born 1978), Finnish former professional boxer
 Kalle Katajisto (born 1991), Finnish motorcycle speedway rider
 Martti Katajisto (1926-2000), Finnish actor
 Olavi Katajisto (1916-unknown), Finnish chess player
 Tero Katajisto (born 1971), Finnish wrestler

Finnish-language surnames